The men's javelin throw at the 2013 World Championships in Athletics was held at the Luzhniki Stadium on 15–17 August.

Change seems to be hitting the event.  Last year's surprise Olympic champion Keshorn Walcott, didn't make the final, nor did the returning bronze medalist Guillermo Martínez.  The defending champion Matthias de Zordo did not return, nor did the Olympic silver medalist Oleksandr Pyatnytsya.  Former two time Olympic gold medalist Andreas Thorkildsen was in danger of not qualifying, on his final attempt, he got into an automatic qualifier, one of only three, joining Ihab Abdelrahman El Sayed, who set the Egyptian national record at 83.62.

Four throws into the final and Tero Pitkämäki took the early lead.  Five throws later Vítězslav Veselý threw the winner 87.17.  Two more throws and Roman Avramenko was sitting in third place after the first round.  In the second round Pitkämäki improved, followed by world leader Dmitriy Tarabin taking over third place.  Veselý's remaining throws wouldn't be enough to place in the top four.  Pitkämäki improved again on his third attempt, falling just 10 cm short of Veselý.  That mark would be good enough for silver.

At the same time as Kenyan women were in their customary position battling the Ethiopians in the women's 5000, Julius Yego's fifth round throw of 85.40 was a Kenyan national record, but more importantly, Kenya's first field event finalist was in third place in the world championships, with only one throw to go.  Throwing before the home crowd, Tarabin's final effort of 86.23 took third place back for good, dashing Yego's hope for a medal.

Records
Prior to the competition, the records were as follows:

Qualification standards

Schedule

Results

Qualification
Qualification: Qualifying Performance 82.50 (Q) or at least 12 best performers (q) advanced to the final.

Final
The final was started at 18.35.

References

External links
Javelin throw results at IAAF website

Javelin throw
Javelin throw at the World Athletics Championships